Birmingham is a ghost town in Lafayette Township in Coshocton County, in the U.S. state of Ohio.

History
Birmingham was laid out in 1830 when the canal was extended to that point.

References

Geography of Coshocton County, Ohio
1830 establishments in Ohio
Populated places established in 1830
Ghost towns in Ohio